Đonović  (also transliterated Djonović) is a Serbian language family name derived from the first name Gjon of Albanian origin. According to the legends of many Montenegrin highlander tribes, their ancestors came from Albania, so surnames like Đonović and Zogović point to Slavicization of Albanians. According to Mihajlo Petrović, some people with Đonović surname claimed that their ancestor was catholic. Đonović surname is mentioned in Dečani chrysobulls in early 14th century.

See also 
 Vojislav Đonović (November 18, 1921 – January 5, 2008), a famous Serbian jazz guitarist - soloist, composer and arranger.

References

Sources 
 
 
 
 

Serbian surnames